HMS Lennox (J276) was a reciprocating engine-powered  during the Second World War.

Design and description

The ships' complement consisted of 85 officers and ratings.

The reciprocating ships had two vertical triple-expansion steam engines, each driving one shaft, using steam provided by two Admiralty three-drum boilers.

The Algerine class was armed with a QF  Mk V anti-aircraft gun and four twin-gun mounts for Oerlikon 20 mm cannon. The latter guns were in short supply when the first ships were being completed and they often got a proportion of single mounts. By 1944, single-barrel Bofors 40 mm mounts began replacing the twin 20 mm mounts on a one for one basis. All of the ships were fitted for four throwers and two rails for depth charges.

Construction and career
The ship was ordered on 3 May 1942 at the Lobnitz & Company at Renfrew, Scotland. She was laid down on 3 March 1943 and launched on 15 October 1943. The ship was commissioned on 18 January 1944.

On 6 June 1944, she swept the seas off Juno Beach during Operation Neptune. On 17 September, she was deployed with her flotilla for Air Sea Rescue duties during Operation Market Garden.

In July 1945, she was deployed to Malaya for Operation Collie.

In March 1946, the ship was sent back to the UK and deployed with the Fishery Protection Squadron from September that year until November 1947. The ship was put into the reserve fleet by February 1948.

In 1956, she was recommissioned into the Fishery Protection duties and was deployed mainly off Iceland and North Norway until February 1958 when she was relieved by the new Type 14 Frigate, HMS Russell. After paying off remained in reserve and was refitted including installation of a Squid Mortar to improve her anti-submarine capability necessary for use as a convoy escort.

In 1960, she was put on the disposal list and sold to BISCO for scrap in Milford Haven in which she arrived in June 1961.

References

Bibliography
 
 
 Peter Elliott (1977) Allied Escort Ships of World War II. MacDonald & Janes,

External links

 

Algerine-class minesweepers of the Royal Navy
Ships built on the River Clyde
1943 ships
World War II minesweepers of the United Kingdom